Ticuna, Tikuna, Tucuna or Tukuna is a language spoken by approximately 50,000 people in the Amazon Basin, including the countries of Brazil, Peru, and Colombia. It is the native language of the Ticuna people and is considered "stable" by ethnologue. Ticuna is generally classified as a language isolate, but may be related to the extinct Yuri language (see Tïcuna-Yuri) and there has been some research indicating similarities between Ticuna and Carabayo.  It is a tonal language, and therefore the meaning of words with the same phonemes can vary greatly simply by changing the tone used to pronounce them.

Tïcuna is also known as Magta, Maguta, Tucuna/Tukuna, and Tukna.

Sociolinguistic situation

Brazil 
Ticuna is the Indigenous language most widely spoken in Brazil.

Despite being home to more than 50% of the Ticunas, Brazil has only recently started to invest in native language education. Brazilian Ticunas now have a written literature and an education provided by the Brazilian National Foundation for the Indian (FUNAI) and the Ministry of Education. Textbooks in Ticuna are used by native teachers trained in both Portuguese and Ticuna to teach the language to the children. A large-scale project has been recording traditional narrations and writing them down to provide the literate Ticunas with some literature to practice with.

Ticuna education is not a privilege, but part of a wider project carried on by the Brazilian government to provide all significant minorities with education in their own language.

In 2012, the Brazilian government launched an educational campaign for the prevention of AIDS and violence against women, the first such campaign in Brazil ever conducted in an indigenous language.

Peru 
Ticunas in Peru have had native language education at least since the 1960s. They use a writing system that was, apparently, the base for the development of the Brazilian one. However, much of the literature available to Peruvian Ticunas comprise standard textbooks.

Colombia 
Colombian Ticunas are taught in Spanish, when they have access to school at all. Since the establishment of Ticuna schools in Brazil some have ventured to attend them .

Christian Ministries 
A number of Christian ministries have reached the Ticuna people. These ministries have translated the bible into the native Ticuna language and even have a weekday radio show that is broadcast in Ticuna, Portuguese, and Spanish by the Latin American Ministries (LAM).

Literacy 
Besides its use at the Ticuna schools, the language has a dozen books published every year, both in Brazil and Peru. Those books employ a specially devised phonetic writing system using conventions similar to those found in Portuguese (except for K instead of C and the letter Ñ instead of NH) instead of the more complex scientific notation found, for instance, at the Language Museum.

In school Ticuna is taught formally. Children in schools typically in areas of Catholic Missionaries are also taught either Portuguese or Spanish as well.

Linguistic structure 
Ticuna is a fairly isolating language morphologically, meaning that most words consist of just one morpheme. However, Ticuna words usually have more than one syllable, unlike isolating languages such as Vietnamese. Ticuna is an unusually tonal language for South America, with over 10 mostly contour tones. Tones are only indicated orthographically, with diacritics, when confusion is likely. The six vowels may be nasal or laryngealized; consonants may also be glottalized. Glottal stop is spelled x, and the sixth vowel ü. Typologically, Ticuna word order is subject–verb–object (SVO), though unusually this can vary within the language.

Research has indicated isolated tonal languages with complex tones are more likely to occur in regions of higher humidity and higher mean average temperature because it is believed the vocal folds can produce less consistent tones in colder, drier air. Ticuna was one of the languages of focus in this study due to its prevalence—and complexity—of tones.

Classification 
Some have tentatively associated the Ticuna language within the proposals of the macro-arawakano or with macro-tukano stocks, although these classifications are highly speculative given the lack of evidence. A more recent hypothesis has linked Yuri-Ticuna with the Saliban and Hoti languages in the Duho stock. However, the linguistic consensus is that Ticuna may actually be a language isolate in its present-day situation, since Yuri is extinct.

Phonology

Vowels
Vowels may be nasalized and/or show creaky voice, under which tones are lowered. There are diphthongs  and  that carry a single tone, contrasting with vowel sequences  and  that carry two tones.

Tones
Ticuna has one of the largest tone inventories in the world with 8–12 phonemic tones depending on the dialect.

Consonants
The consonants of Ticuna consist of the following phonemes:

Natively, Ticuna has no lateral or uvular consonants, although /l/ is found in some spanish loanwords.

A central  vowel sound may also be pronounced as a back  sound. Other sounds,  are found in Spanish loans.

Syntax 
Ticuna displays nominative/accusative alignment, with person, number, noun class, and clause type indexed on the verb via proclitics. Transitive and unergative verbs tend to favor an Subject-(Object)-Verb word order, while unaccusative verbs show a preference for Verb-Subject word order.

Common words 

The counting words in Ticuna imply a base five system of counting as the word for five is the combination of "one five". Six through nine all contain the same beginning "naixmixwa rü" and then append the values for one through four respectively (such that six is "naixmixwa rü" and "wüxi" meaning one).

Examples of spoken language 
An example of spoken Ticuna can be found here.

Vocabulary (Loukotka 1968)

Loukotka (1968) lists the following basic vocabulary items.

References

1. https://joshuaproject.net/people_groups/15471

External links 

"Conversational Tikuna" – Ticuna course and grammar at the Summer Institute of Linguistics
Ticuna publications for download
OLAC resources in and about the Ticuna language
Ticuna (tca) language documentation: A guide to materials in the California Language Archive (Skilton 2021)

Ticuna–Yuri languages
Indigenous languages of Western Amazonia
Languages of Peru
Languages of Colombia
Languages of Brazil
Tonal languages
Isolating languages
Subject–verb–object languages

hr:Tucuna
it:Ticuna